Stanton railway station served the village of Stanton Fitzwarren, in the historic county of Wiltshire, England, from 1883 to 1962 on the Highworth branch line.

History
The station was opened on 9 May 1883 by the Great Western Railway. It was known as Stanton Halt in the handbook of stations in 1949 and in Bradshaw in 1952. It closed on 2 March 1953. The last train ran on 3 August 1962, which was used for employees at Swindon Works.

References

Disused railway stations in Wiltshire
Former Great Western Railway stations
Railway stations in Great Britain opened in 1883
Railway stations in Great Britain closed in 1953
1883 establishments in England
1962 disestablishments in England